Threnody is the second album from Swedish melodic death metal/industrial band Engel. This is the final Engel release with Daniel "Mojjo" Moilanen on drums. Threnody was finished by the end of 2008, but due to issues with their former label, SPV GmbH, the release of the album was delayed.

Music videos were released for the demo version of "Elbow And Knives" (entitled "Someone Died (Made You God)"), "Sense the Fire" and "Six Feet Deep".

Track listing

Release history

Personnel
 Magnus "Mangan" Klavborn – vocals
 Niclas Engelin – guitars
 Marcus Sunesson – guitars
 Steve Drennan – bass
 Daniel "Mojjo" Moilanen – drums

References 

2010 albums
Engel (band) albums
Avex Group albums
Season of Mist albums
Albums produced by Tue Madsen